Sylvan is an unincorporated community in Sylvan Township, Cass County, Minnesota, United States. It is located between Pillager and Baxter along State Highway 210 (MN 210), near 24th Avenue SW.

References

Unincorporated communities in Cass County, Minnesota
Unincorporated communities in Minnesota